András Pál (born 19 August 1985) is a Hungarian soccer player who plays for Tiszakécske.

Career statistics

References 
HLSZ 
MLSZ 

1985 births
Footballers from Budapest
Living people
Hungarian footballers
Hungary youth international footballers
Association football forwards
Újpest FC players
Vasas SC players
BFC Siófok players
MTK Budapest FC players
Soroksár SC players
Tiszakécske FC footballers
Nemzeti Bajnokság I players
Nemzeti Bajnokság II players
Nemzeti Bajnokság III players